Sonora State Highway 37 (Carretera Estatal 37) is a highway in the Mexican state of Sonora.

It runs from Puerto Peñasco to the junction with Mexican Federal Highway 2 at Caborca.

References
 

037